A red card is a type of penalty card that is shown in many sports after a rules infraction.

Red card may also refer to:

Art, entertainment, and media
 Red Card (album), 1976 release by Streetwalkers
 Red card, suit (cards) of hearts or diamonds
 Operation Red Card, 2006 Motion Picture Association anti-piracy drive in Asia
 RedCard 20-03, 2002 extreme football video game
 Red card trailer

Credit cards
 American Express Red, credit card
 Target REDcard, a credit card issued by Target Corporation

Legal
 Red card, in capital punishment in Iraq, a legal notice that execution is imminent
 Red Card Solution, a guest worker program proposal for immigration to the United States, created by the Vernon K. Krieble Foundation and endorsed by Newt Gingrich in November 2011

Work related
 Red card, Industrial Workers of the World membership card
 Red card, for wildland fire suppression, a U.S. professional certification